Francesco Cattenari (born 17 January 1990) is an Italian footballer who plays as a goalkeeper for Avezzano Calcio.

In summer 2012 he was sold to Campobasso in a co-ownership deal. In June 2013 Pescara gave up the remain 50% registration rights of the player to Campobasso.

References

External links
 Pescara Calcio profile
 

1990 births
Living people
Sportspeople from the Province of Frosinone
Italian footballers
Delfino Pescara 1936 players
Serie B players
Serie C players
Association football goalkeepers
Footballers from Lazio